is a train station on the Minobu Line of Central Japan Railway Company (JR Central) located in city of Kōfu, Yamanashi Prefecture, Japan.

Lines
Zenkōji Station is served by the Minobu Line and is located 86.3 kilometers from the southern terminus of the line at Fuji Station.

Layout
Zenkōji Station has one side platform serving a single bi-directional track. The station is unattended. There is no station building, but only a rain shelter on the platform, since the station building burned down in 1983.

Adjacent stations

??? is a railway station on the Minobu Line of Central Japan Railway Company (JR Central) located in the city of Kōfu, Yamanashi Prefecture, Japan. The station is located 86.3 rail kilometers from the southern terminus of the Minobu Line at Fuji Station.

History
Zenkōji Station was opened on March 30, 1928 as a signal stop on the Fuji-Minobu Line. It was elevated to a full station when operations were consigned to the government on October 1, 1938. The line came under control of the Japanese Government Railways on May 1, 1941. The JGR became the JNR (Japan National Railway) after World War II. All freight operations were discontinued on November 1, 1960. The station has been unattended since April 10, 1983. Along with the division and privatization of JNR on April 1, 1987, the station came under the control of the Central Japan Railway Company.

Surrounding area
 Kōfu Higashi Junior High School
 Kōfu Higashi High School

See also
 List of railway stations in Japan

External links

   Minobu Line station information 

Railway stations in Japan opened in 1938
Railway stations in Yamanashi Prefecture
Minobu Line
Kōfu, Yamanashi